Intercontinental Exchange, Inc. (ICE) is an American company formed in 2000 that operates global financial exchanges and clearing houses and provides mortgage technology, data and listing services. Listed on the Fortune 500, S&P 500, and Russell 1000, the company owns exchanges for financial and commodity markets, and operates 12 regulated exchanges and marketplaces.  This includes ICE futures exchanges in the United States, Canada and Europe, the Liffe futures exchanges in Europe, the New York Stock Exchange, equity options exchanges and OTC energy, credit and equity markets.

ICE also owns and operates six central clearing houses: ICE Clear U.S., ICE Clear Europe, ICE Clear Singapore, ICE Clear Credit, ICE Clear Netherlands and ICE NGX. ICE has offices in Atlanta, New York, London, Chicago, Bedford, Houston, Winnipeg, Amsterdam, Calgary, Washington, D.C., San Francisco, Tel Aviv, Rome, Hyderabad, Singapore and Melbourne.

History 
Jeffrey Sprecher was a power plant developer who spotted a need for a seamless market in natural gas used to fuel power stations.  In the late 1990s, Sprecher acquired Continental Power Exchange, Inc. with the objective of developing an Internet-based platform to provide a more transparent and efficient market structure for over-the-counter energy commodity trading.

In May 2000, ICE was founded by Sprecher and backed by Goldman Sachs, Morgan Stanley, BP, Total, Shell, Deutsche Bank and Société Générale.

The new exchange increased price transparency, efficiency, liquidity, and had lower costs than manual trading. While the company's original focus was energy products (crude and refined oil, natural gas, power, and emissions), acquisitions subsequently expanded its activity into soft commodities (sugar, cotton and coffee), foreign exchange and equity index futures.

In a response to US financial crisis in 2008, Sprecher formed ICE US Trust, based in New York and now called ICE Clear Credit LLC, to serve as a limited-purpose bank, a clearing house for credit default swaps. Sprecher worked closely with the Federal Reserve to serve as its over-the-counter (OTC) derivatives clearing house. "US regulators were keen on the kind of clearing house for opaque over-the-counter (OTC) derivatives as a risk management device. In the absence of a central counterparty – which would guarantee pay-outs should a trading party be unable to do so – there was a high risk of massive market disruption."

The principal backers for ICE US Trust were the same financial institutions most affected by the crisis, the top nine of the world's largest banks (Goldman Sachs, Bank of America, Citi, Credit Suisse, Deutsche Bank, JPMorgan, Merrill Lynch, Morgan Stanley and UBS). Sprecher's clearing house cleared their global credit default swaps (CDS) in exchange for sharing profits with these banks.  By September 30, 2008, the Financial Post warned that the "$54000bn credit derivatives market faced its biggest test in October 2008 as billions of dollars worth of contracts on now-defaulted derivatives would be auctioned by the International Swaps and Derivatives Association . In his article in the Financial Post, he described ICE as a "US-based electronic futures exchange" which raised the stakes on October 30, 2008, in its effort to expand in the $54000 bn credit derivatives market.

By 2010, Intercontinental Exchange had cleared more than $10 trillion in credit default swaps (CDS) through its subsidiaries, ICE Trust CDS (now ICE Clear Credit). By 2017 Intercontinental Exchange had been named to the Fortune Future 50 determining the top 50 companies that are best positioned to adapt and deliver growth in a complex environment. ICE was also named to the Fortune 500 in June 2017 as the only exchange operator included in the ranking.

On September 6, 2019, Bloomberg reported that ICE was growing closer to offering Bitcoin futures trading, as "its Bakkt unit opens its digital-asset custody warehouse today to customers." On September 23, 2019, Bitcoin will be able to be acquired.

Mergers and acquisitions 
Intercontinental Exchange has had a policy to grow through the acquisition of other exchanges, a number of these have been successful while others have failed due to concerns by regulators or others that the new company would have created a monopoly situation.  The major acquisition and attempted acquisitions have included:

2001: International Petroleum Exchange (IPE) 
In June 2001, ICE expanded its business into futures trading by acquiring the London-based International Petroleum Exchange (IPE), now ICE Futures Europe, which operated Europe's leading open-outcry energy futures exchange. Since 2003, ICE has partnered with the Chicago Climate Exchange (CCX) to host its electronic marketplaces. In April 2005, the entire ICE portfolio of energy futures became fully electronic and ICE closed International Petroleum Exchange's high profile and historic trading floor.

2007: New York Board of Trade (NYBOT) 
ICE became a publicly traded company on November 16, 2005, and was added to the Russell 1000 Index on June 30, 2006.  The company expanded rapidly in 2007, acquiring the New York Board of Trade (NYBOT), and ChemConnect (a chemical commodity market).

2007: Chicago Board of Trade - (unsuccessful bid) 
In March 2007 ICE made an unsuccessful $9.9 billion bid for the Chicago Board of Trade, which was instead acquired by the CME Group.

2007: Winnipeg Commodity Exchange (WCE) 
IntercontinentalExchange Inc., the "upstart Atlanta-based energy bourse" purchased the privately held 120-year-old Winnipeg Commodity Exchange, known for its canola futures contract, for $40 million.

The Winnipeg Commodity Exchange (WCE) was renamed ICE Futures Canada as of January 1, 2008.
In 2004, the Winnipeg Commodity Exchange had "closed its open-outcry trading floor" becoming "the first North American agricultural futures exchange to trade exclusively on an electronic platform" by trading via the "Chicago Board of Trade's electronic platform, and [using] clearing services from the Kansas City Board of Trade. IntercontinentalExchange converted Winnipeg Commodity Exchange contracts to the IntercontinentalExchange platform. IntercontinentalExchange maintained an office and "small core staff" in Winnipeg, Manitoba. The Manitoba Securities Commission oversee its operations.

2008: Creditex 
In June 2008, ICE announced that it had entered into a definitive merger agreement to acquire Creditex Group Inc. (Creditex). The transaction consideration totaled $625 million comprising approximately $565 million in ICE common stock and $60 million in cash, as well as a working capital adjustment to be finalized at closing. Upon the closing of the transaction, Creditex Group became a wholly-owned subsidiary of ICE, operating under the Creditex name.

2008: TSX Group's Natural Gas Exchange Partnership 
In January 2008, ICE partnered with Canada's TSX Group's Natural Gas Exchange, expanding their offering to clearing and settlement services for physical OTC natural gas contracts.

2010: Climate Exchange 
In April 2010, ICE acquired Climate Exchange PLC for 395 million pounds ($622 million) and European Climate Exchange (ECX) as part of its purchase. Exchange-traded emissions products were first offered by the European Climate Exchange (ECX), which was established in 2005, by listing products on the ICE Futures Europe's trading platform. ICE Futures Europe is the leading market for carbon dioxide emissions. ICE's ECX products comply with the requirements of the European Union Emission Trading Scheme.

2013: NYSE Euronext 
In February 2011, in the wake of an announced merger of NYSE Euronext with Deutsche Börse, speculation developed that ICE and Nasdaq could mount a counter-bid of their own for NYSE Euronext. ICE was thought to be looking to acquire the American exchange's derivatives business, Nasdaq its cash equities business. As of the time of the speculation, "NYSE Euronext’s market value was $9.75 billion. Nasdaq was valued at $5.78 billion, while ICE was valued at $9.45 billion." Late in the month, Nasdaq was reported to be considering asking either ICE or the Chicago Mercantile Exchange (CME) to join in what would probably be an $11–12 billion counterbid for NYSE. On April 1, ICE and Nasdaq made an $11.3 billion offer which was rejected April 10 by NYSE. Another week later, ICE and Nasdaq sweetened their offer, including a $.17 increase per share to $42.67 and a $350 million breakup fee if the deal were to encounter regulatory trouble. The two said the offer was a $2 billion (21%) premium over the Deutsche offer and that they had fully committed financing of $3.8 billion from lenders to finance the deal.

The Justice Department, also in April, "initiated an antitrust review of the proposal, which would have brought nearly all U.S. stock listings under a merged Nasdaq-NYSE." In May, saying it "became clear that we would not be successful in securing regulatory approval," the Nasdaq and ICE withdrew their bid. The European Commission then blocked the Deutsche merger on February 1, 2012, citing the fact that the merged company would have a near monopoly.

In December 2012, ICE announced it would buy NYSE Euronext (this time without the involvement of Nasdaq) for $8.2 billion, pending regulatory approval. Jeffrey Sprecher will retain his position as chairman and CEO. The boards of directors of both ICE and NYSE Euronext approved the acquisition, which took place in 2013.

In 2014, ICE spun off Euronext, keeping NYSE and LIFFE, renaming it ICE Futures Europe.

2014: SuperDerivatives Inc. 
In September 2014, ICE announced that it had agreed to acquire SuperDerivatives, a provider of risk management analytics, financial market data and valuation services. SuperDerivatives was purchased for $350 million on October 7, 2014.

2015: Interactive Data Corporation (IDC) 
In October 2015, ICE announced that it had entered into a definitive agreement to acquire Interactive Data Corporation (IDC), a provider of financial market data, analytics, from Silver Lake, involved in technology investing, and Warburg Pincus, a private equity firm focused on growth investing. The acquisition was valued at approximately $5.2 billion, including $3.65 billion in cash and $1.55 billion in ICE common stock, and builds on ICE's global market data growth strategy by expanding the markets served, adding technology platforms and increasing new data and valuation services. Completion of the transaction was subject to regulatory approval and other customary closing conditions. The transaction completed on December 14, 2015.

2015: Trayport and subsequent divestment 
In December 2015, ICE acquired Trayport for $650 million from GFI Group. Trayport provides a trading technology platform that serves brokers, exchanges, clearing houses and trading participants, primarily in the European utility markets. Approximately 70%-80% of European utility trades flow through its platform.

Following the acquisition, the Competition and Markets Authority (CMA) called in the merger for review. In October 2016 it announced its decision to require ICE to sell Trayport, having ruled that the merger could lead to a substantial lessening of competition.  ICE challenged the decision in the Competition Appeal Tribunal (CAT), but the CAT upheld the CMA's decision. As a result, ICE sold Trayport to TMX Group in October 2017, in exchange for certain TMX Group assets and cash of £350 million. The CMA's ruling against ICE was the first time CMA had required that a company sell an asset that it had already bought.

2016: Standard & Poor’s Securities Evaluations (SPSE) 
In March 2016, ICE agreed to acquire Standard & Poor's Securities Evaluations, Inc. (SPSE) and Credit Market Analysis (CMA), two assets under the S&P Global Market Intelligence business unit from McGraw Hill Financial. Most terms of the agreement were not disclosed. In October 2016 it had completed its all-cash acquisition.

2017: TMX Atrium 
In February 2017, ICE announced it had entered an agreement to acquire TMX Atrium, an extranet and wireless services business from TMX Group. Terms of the agreement were not disclosed, and the transaction is expected to close within 90 days, subject to regulatory approvals. The financial impact of the transaction will be immaterial and was included in ICE's financial guidance for 2017.

2017: BofA Merrill Lynch Global Research Index Platform (BofAML) 
In February 2017, ICE announced that it had entered into a definitive agreement to acquire the Global Research division's index platform from Bank of America Merrill Lynch. The BofAML indices are the second most used fixed income indices by assets under management (AUM) globally, and upon closing, the AUM benchmarked against the combined fixed income index business of ICE will be nearly $1 trillion. Upon closing, the indices will be re-branded as the ICE BofAML indices. The terms of the agreement were not disclosed, and the transaction is expected to be completed in the second half of 2017. The financial impact of the transaction is expected to be immaterial in 2017. In October 2017 ICE announced it has completed its acquisition. Furthermore, in August 2019, it announced it had entered into an agreement to acquire a family of fixed income volatility indices, including the prominent Merrill Lynch Option Volatility Estimate (“MOVE”) family of indices.

2017: Euroclear 
In October 2017, ICE  announced it had acquired a 4.7% stake in Euroclear for EUR 275 million. ICE anticipates having one representative join the Board of Euroclear. Euroclear is a leading provider of post-trade services, including settlement, central securities depositories and related services for cross-border transactions across asset classes. It is understood ICE increased its stake to 10% in early 2018.

2017: Virtu BondPoint 
In October 2017, ICE announced it had entered into an agreement to acquire Virtu BondPoint from Virtu Financial for $400 million in cash. The acquisition was reportedly completed on January 2, 2018, as announced by ICE.  BondPoint is an integrated, automated platform offering additional fixed income execution services and one of the broadest sets of fixed income instruments.

2018: Chicago Stock Exchange (CHX) 
In April 2018, ICE announced that it had entered into an agreement to acquire the Chicago Stock Exchange (CHX), a full-service stock exchange, including trading, data and corporate listings services. The transaction is expected to close in the second quarter of 2018, subject to regulatory approvals. Terms of the transaction were not disclosed, and the financial impact will not be material to ICE or impact capital return plans.

2018: TMC Bonds LLC 
In May 2018, ICE announced that it had entered into an agreement to acquire TMC Bonds LLC for $685 million in cash. Established in 2000, TMC Bonds is a fixed income marketplace, supporting anonymous trading in various asset classes including Municipals, Corporates, Treasuries, Agencies and Certificates of Deposit. The transaction is expected to close in the second half of 2018, subject to customary regulatory and anti-trust approvals, and is not expected to materially impact 2018 financial results or capital returns.

2018: Merscorp Holding, Inc 
In October 2018, ICE announced that it had acquired the remaining equity of Merscorp Holding, Inc., owner of Mortgage Electronic Registration Systems, Inc. (MERS). Merscorp owns and operates the MERS System, a national electronic registry that tracks the changes in servicing rights and beneficial ownership interests in U.S.-based mortgage loans. ICE had owned a majority equity interest in MERS since 2016. Earlier this month, ICE successfully moved the MERS System infrastructure to the ICE Mahwah data center, an integral requirement for completing the final acquisition of the business. The price and terms of the transaction were not disclosed and will not be material to ICE's earnings or have an impact on capital return plans.

2019: Simplifile, LC 
In May 2019, ICE announced that it had agreed to acquire Simplifile, LC. Simplifile operates a network connecting agents and jurisdictions involved with residential mortgage records.

ICE will pay $335 million to acquire Simplifile, which is based in Provo, Utah and has no debt. The transaction is expected to close in the third quarter of 2019. Upon closing, Simplifile, which has approximately 200 employees, will continue to be based in Provo and operate under the Simplifile name.

2020: Ellie Mae 
In August 2020, ICE announced that it had entered into a definitive agreement to acquire Ellie Mae, a cloud-based platform provider for the mortgage finance industry. The transaction with Ellie Mae, a portfolio company of Thoma Bravo, a leading private equity investment firm, valued Ellie Mae at approximately $11 billion. The deal, following ICE's taking a majority stake in MERS in 2016, purchasing the remainder in 2018, and acquiring Simplifile in 2019, made ICE and its growing ICE Mortgage Technology a leading provider of end-to-end electronic workflow solutions for the U.S. residential mortgage industry. The transaction completed successfully in September 2020 after regulatory approval.

2021: risQ 

On December 9, 2021, ICE acquired risQ, a geospatial and climate data modeling start-up company, after announcing partnerships with the company to develop climate risk and ESG analytics models for municipal bond markets in January 2020 and mortgage-backed securities markets in March 2021.

2022: Black Knight 

In May 2022, ICE announced that it had entered into a definitive agreement to acquire Black Knight, Inc., a software, data and analytics company that serves the housing finance continuum. The cash and stock transaction values Black Knight at $85 per share, or a market value of $13.1 billion. The transaction is expected to close in the first half of 2023, following the receipt of regulatory approvals, Black Knight stockholder approval, and the satisfaction of customary closing conditions.

START== Operations ==
ICE provides exchange trading and clearing services in a number of different markets.  Its main products include:

 Exchange traded futures and options
 Agriculture
 Financials
 Crude Oil and Refined
 Electricity
 Natural Gas/Liquids
 UK Natural Gas
 Other
 Over-the-counter instruments (ICE OTC)
 Crude Oil and Refined
 Natural Gas
 Electricity

The company is split into the following subsidiaries:

 Markets
 ICE Futures U.S.
 ICE Futures Europe - one of the world's largest energy futures and options exchanges
 ICE Futures Singapore
 ICE Endex
 ICE OTC Energy
 ICE Swap Trade & Creditex
 ICE Bonds
 Clearing
 ICE Clear U.S.
 ICE Clear Europe
 ICE NGX
 ICE Clear Singapore
 ICE Clear Netherlands
 ICE Clear Credit

ICE Data Services 
In June 2016 Intercontinental Exchange introduced the expanded ICE Data Services, which combined exchange data, valuations, analytics, and other software used by the New York Stock Exchange (NYSE), SuperDerivatives and Interactive Data (IDC).

ICE originally formed its ICE Data subsidiary in 2003, recognizing the rising demand for exchange data as markets became increasingly automated. ICE continues to invest in its data services to address evolving customer needs driven by regulatory reform, market fragmentation, passive investing and indexation, along with increased demand for data capacity and security, and independent valuations. Their customers include global financial institutions, asset managers, commercial hedging firms, risk managers, corporate issuers and individual investors.

ICE Data Services has offices in California, New York, Chicago, Bedford MA, London, Rome, Dublin, Tel Aviv, Hong Kong, Singapore, Tokyo, Hyderabad and Melbourne.

See also 

 List of futures exchanges
 Securities market participants (United States)

References 

 Bundled references

External links

 
 
 
 
 
 

 
Financial services companies established in 2000
Financial services companies of the United States
Companies listed on the New York Stock Exchange
Energy companies of the United States
Companies based in Atlanta
Commodity exchanges in the United States
Energy exchanges
Economy of London
Petroleum economics
Futures exchanges
American companies established in 2000
2005 initial public offerings